The Midlands Amateur Football Association (MAFA) is an association football league competition for amateur clubs in the Dundee area of Scotland.  The association is affiliated to the Scottish Amateur Football Association.

The association is currently composed of one division with 15 teams.

League Membership
In order to join the association, clubs need to apply and are then voted in by current member clubs.

External links
Official website

Football leagues in Scotland
Football in Dundee
Football in Angus, Scotland
Amateur association football in Scotland